The 8×58mmR Danish Krag also known as the 8×58mmRD is a late 19th-century rimmed centerfire military rifle cartridge similar to other early smokeless powder designs. It was briefly adopted by Norway and Sweden and remained the standard Danish service rifle cartridge from 1889 until 1945.

Cartridge dimensions
The 8×58mmR Danish Krag has 4.55 ml (70.2 grains H2O) of cartridge case capacity.

8×58mmR Danish Krag cartridge dimensions. All sizes in millimeters (mm). The dimensions of this drawing come from the ammunition manufacturer RWS and differ somewhat between various sources.

Americans define the shoulder angle at alpha/2 ≈ 16.5 degrees. Ø lands = , Ø grooves = .

There are no official C.I.P. (Commission Internationale Permanente pour l'Epreuve des Armes à Feu Portatives) rulings for this cartridge (2017).
Varying sources quote the 8×58mmR Danish Krag can handle from  up to  Pmax piezo pressure. This Pmax level range is extreme, so loading up to a high Pmax level can be dangerous in historic arms.

A dangerous error can occur when confusion occurs between the 8×58mmR Danish Krag and the 8×58mmR. The latter being an old German differing chambering.

Military history 
Sweden implemented a major arsenal rebuilding of their M1867 rifles for the 8×58mmR, and Norway experimentally compared 8×58mmR Remington rolling block conversions to the Jarmann M1884. Its service in Sweden was very brief, though, since the 6.5×55mm was developed by Sweden and Norway in 1891, formally approved in 1893, and entered service in the Norwegian Krag–Jørgensen rifle in 1894, and in the Swedish Mauser carbine in 1894 and rifle in 1896. Denmark modernized military loading of the 8×58mmR in 1908 using smokeless powder with spitzer bullets; and Danish troops were still armed with the 8×58mmR when Germany invaded in 1940.

Sporting use
Surplus military rifles have been used for hunting; and ammunition was manufactured in Otterup and by Norma Precision after World War II. Documentation is scarce for the design pressure specifications of these surplus firearms. Although modern weapons may have been designed for smokeless powder loadings, their similarity to arms designed for gunpowder loadings causes uncertainty about the safety of firing modern cartridges in weapons lacking proof test documentation.

See also
 Table of handgun and rifle cartridges

References

Military cartridges
Pistol and rifle cartridges
Rimmed cartridges